Ayumi Hamasaki Arena Tour 2002 A is a Japanese-language live album released on January 29, 2003, the same day Ayumi Hamasaki Stadium Tour 2002 A  (Stylized as ayumi hamasaki STADIUM TOUR 2002 A) was also released.

Track listing
 I am…
 opening Run
 Naturally
 NEVER EVER
 A Song for XX
 Free & Easy
 evolution
 AUDIENCE
 UNITE!

---ENCORE---
 independent
 flower garden
 Trauma
 no more words

Special unplugged version
 M
 Dearest

DVD bonus tracks
 Daybreak
 Who…

Ayumi Hamasaki video albums
2003 video albums
Live video albums
2003 live albums